Latvia has participated in the Eurovision Song Contest 22 times since making its debut at the contest in 2000, where the group Brainstorm finished third with the song "My Star". Latvia won the contest in 2002, with Marie N and the song "I Wanna", defeating Malta by 12 points. Latvia is the second former Soviet country to win the contest. The 2003 contest was held in the Latvian capital Riga.

Latvia did not participate in the final from 2009 to 2014, when they failed to qualify from the semi-finals for six consecutive years, including finishing last on three occasions, in 2009, 2010 and 2013. Latvia qualified for the final for the first time since  at the  contest with Aminata and the song "Love Injected". Her sixth place in the final is Latvia's fourth top 10 finish and best result in the contest since 2005.

Latvia has the distinction of having finished last in the Eurovision semi-finals more than any other country. Since its introduction in 2004, Latvia has finished last in five semi-finals, with Intars Busulis, Aisha, PeR, Triana Park and Samanta Tīna.

Participation overview 
All of Latvia's entries have been performed in English, except for three entries. In 2004 Fomins and Kleins performed "" in Latvian, in 2007 Bonaparti.lv performed "" in Italian and in 2009 Intars Busulis, having won Eirodziesma 2009 with "" in Latvian, performed the song in Russian as "". With the exception of "The Moon Is Rising" by Samanta Tīna in 2021, all Latvian Eurovision entries have been chosen through a national final.

Hostings

Related involvement

Heads of delegation

Commentators and spokespersons

Photogallery

See also
Latvia in the Junior Eurovision Song Contest – Junior version of the Eurovision Song Contest.
Latvia in Eurovision Choir – A competition organised by the EBU for amateur choirs.
Latvia in the Eurovision Young Dancers – A competition organised by the EBU for younger dancers aged between 16 and 21.
Latvia in the Eurovision Young Musicians – A competition organised by the EBU for musicians aged 18 years and younger.

Notes

References

External links
 Points to and from Latvia eurovisioncovers.co.uk

 
Countries in the Eurovision Song Contest